Cacia newmanni is a species of beetle in the family Cerambycidae first described by Francis Polkinghorne Pascoe in 1857. It occurs in Singapore, Borneo and Malaysia.

References

Cacia (beetle)
Beetles described in 1857